Priorities USA Action is a progressive political action committee and is the largest Democratic Party super PAC. Founded in 2011, it supported Barack Obama's 2012 re-election campaign. It was the primary super PAC supporting Hillary Clinton's 2016 presidential campaign. It focused mainly on high-dollar donors. As of September 2016, it had amassed $132 million in support of Clinton. The top six donors to the super PAC have given $43.5 million, which is a third of the money collected by Priorities USA Action in the 2016 election cycle. The super PAC raised $21.7 million in August 2016, marking its largest monthly fundraising haul.

History 
The super PAC was founded in 2011 by former Obama campaign officials Bill Burton and Sean Sweeney to raise funds from wealthy donors, including corporations and unions, and support the re-election of President Barack Obama. As per FEC rules established in the wake of the Citizens United Supreme Court decision, the group is legally prohibited from coordinating with the candidate or his or her campaign. The group is led by Guy Cecil, who was the political director for Hillary Clinton's 2008 presidential bid. The Board of Directors includes Cecil, Jim Messina, Charles A. Baker III, Allida Black, David Brock, Maria Echaveste, Justin Gray, William P. Hite, Stephanie Schriock, Marva Smalls, Joe Solomonese, Greg Speed, and Randi Weingarten.

Its key backers in 2012 included Paul Begala, Teddy Johnston, Geoff Garin, Ellen Malcolm, Jeffrey Katzenberg, Bill Maher, Mary Beth Cahill, and Irwin M. Jacobs.

In 2014, the organization began to focus efforts on raising funds to help Hillary Clinton in her 2016 presidential campaign. Jim Messina and Jennifer Granholm (former Governor of Michigan) were drafted to serve as co-chairs of the organization. Granholm resigned in August 2015 to join Correct the Record, another pro-Clinton super PAC.

The group was headed by David Brock from 2014 until his resignation in February 2015.

In 2020, after remaining neutral in the highly contested 2020 Democratic Party presidential primaries, Priorities USA endorsed Joe Biden after his apparent delegate lead from the Super Tuesday primaries.

Criticism 
On August 7, 2012 Priorities USA Action put out an ad titled Understands, which "offers one man's story to suggest the investment practices of Romney and Bain Capital led to the early death of his wife".  The man, Joe Soptic, explains that after the GST Steel plant was shut down, he lost his job and health insurance for him and his family which led to his wife's death from cancer. Politifact rated the claim made in the ad false, noting that the ad "uses innuendo for a serious allegation, but there's no proof directly linking the death to Bain". Factcheck.org found the ad to be "misleading on several accounts", including that Soptic's wife died "five years after the plant closed".  Factcheck.org also points out that, when the plant closed, she had her own employer-sponsored coverage which she lost two years later and, furthermore, that Romney was running the 2002 Winter Olympics when the plant closed.

See also 

Ready PAC
Correct the Record
American Bridge 21st Century
Buffy Wicks

References

External links 
 
 Priorities USA Action on OpenSecrets.org
 Priorities USA Action at Ballotpedia.org
 PolitiFact.com file

Barack Obama 2012 presidential campaign
Hillary Clinton 2016 presidential campaign
Joe Biden 2020 presidential campaign
United States political action committees
2012 United States presidential campaigns
2016 United States presidential campaigns
2020 United States presidential campaigns